Polyidus may refer to:

 Polyidus, a Corinthian seer of Greek mythology
 Polyidus (poet), a Greek poet and painter of the fifth century B.C.
 Polyidus of Thessaly, a Greek engineer of the fourth-century B.C.